W. may refer to:

 SoHo (Australian TV channel) (previously W.), an Australian pay television channel
 W. (film), a 2008 American biographical drama film based on the life of George W. Bush
 "W.", the fifth track from Codeine's 1992 EP Barely Real

See also
 W
 W (disambiguation)